Kima Tullpa (Ancash Quechua kima three (kimsa), Quechua tullpa cook stove, "three cook stoves", also spelled Quimatullpa) is a mountain in the Cordillera Negra in the Andes of Peru which reaches a height of approximately . It is located in the Ancash Region, Yungay Province, Shupluy District.

References

Mountains of Peru
Mountains of Ancash Region